Aleksandr Pavlenko may refer to:

 Aleksandr Pavlenko (born 1985), Russian footballer
 Aleksandr Vladimirovich Pavlenko (born 1976), Russian footballer
 Alexander Pavlenko (born 1971), Russian murderer
 Oleksandr Pavlenko (1941–1995), Ukrainian footballer